Keke Morabe (born 21 April 2001) in QwaQwa South Africa is a South African rugby union player for the  in the Currie Cup. His regular position is lock or flanker.

Morabe was named in the  side for the 2022 Currie Cup Premier Division.

References

South African rugby union players
Living people
Rugby union locks
Rugby union flankers
Rugby union number eights
Western Province (rugby union) players
2001 births
Stormers players